The former colonial power, the Netherlands, left an extensive vocabulary. These Dutch loanwords, and also from other non Italo-Iberian, European languages loanwords which came via Dutch, cover all aspects of life. Some Dutch loanwords, having clusters of several consonants, pose difficulties to speakers of Indonesian. This problem is usually solved by insertion of the schwa. For example, Dutch schroef  → sekrup . Many Indonesian vocabulary ending "-i" (e.g.:administras-i) also are known from the Dutch vocabulary influence "-ie" (e.g.:administrat-ie). All the months from January (Januari) to December (Desember) used in Indonesian are also derived from Dutch. It is estimated that 10,000 words in the Indonesian language can be traced to the Dutch language.

Rule

Examples

A

B

C

D

E

F

G

H

I

J

K

L

M

N

O

P

R

S

T

V

vermak

W

Y

References

External links 
 Indonesian Etymology Database
 SEAlang Library Orthography search engine on Loan-Words in Indonesian and Malay

Indonesian words and phrases
Dutch loanwords in Indonesian
Dutch
Indonesian
Dutch language in Asia